Jiřice is a municipality and village in Pelhřimov District in the Vysočina Region of the Czech Republic. It has about 900 inhabitants.

Administrative parts
Villages of Močidla and Speřice are administrative parts of Jiřice.

Notable people
Otto Schöniger (1889–1958), equestrian

References

Villages in Pelhřimov District